Gavyn is a masculine given name and a variant spelling of Gavin. Notable people with the name include:

Gavyn Farr Arthur (1951–2016), British judge and Lord Mayor of London
Gavyn Bailey (born 1998), American singer-songwriter and producer
Gavyn Davies (born 1950), British businessman
Gavyn Wright, British violinist and orchestra leader
Gavyn Locke, Amateur developer, notably friends with Ryan Heylman, and Dayna Forensic Science
Fictional characters
Prince Gavyn, superhero from DC Comics
Gavyn Sykes, character from the Star Wars franchise

Masculine given names